Jean-Pierre Chambellan (born 7 October 1958) is a French former wrestler who competed in the 1984 Summer Olympics.

References

External links
 

1958 births
Living people
Olympic wrestlers of France
Wrestlers at the 1984 Summer Olympics
French male sport wrestlers